Chillisquaque may refer to:

A variant of Chalahgawtha (Chillicothe), a Shawnee tribal division
Chillisquaque Creek, Pennsylvania
East Chillisquaque Township, Northumberland County, Pennsylvania
West Chillisquaque Township, Northumberland County, Pennsylvania